One Bright Day is a stage play written by Sigmund Miller. It has been adapted for television at least three times.

Robert Montgomery Presents
A version aired as part of American anthology series Robert Montgomery Presents, on October 29, 1956. A 60-minute series, the episode likely ran between 47 and 50 minutes excluding the commercials (exact running time unknown). Cast included Katherine Anderson, Sidney Blackmer, House Jameson, Norma Moore, and Robert Webber.

ITV Television Playhouse
A version aired as part of British anthology series ITV Television Playhouse, on 6 December 1956, and re-titled The Lion's Share. A 60-minute series, the exact running time excluding commercials is unknown. Cast included Alan Gifford, Betty McDowall, William Franklyn, Henry Kendall, Vincent Holman, Al Mulock, George Ricarde, Rita Stevens, Victor Wood, Mark Bellamy, Don Gilliland, and Maurice Durant. This version is missing, believed lost.

1959 Australian TV version
A version aired on Australian television in 1959 on non-commercial broadcaster ABC.

The adaptation was done by Alan Seymour.

Broadcast live in Sydney on 7 October 1959, a kinescope was made of the broadcast and shown in Melbourne on 30 December 1959. (It is not known if it was shown on ABC's then-new stations in Brisbane and Adelaide). 75 minutes in duration.<ref</ref>

It is not known if the kinescope recording of this version still exists or not.

Star Joe McCormick was an American actor.

Cast
Joe McCormick as Julian Prescott, the president of the company
Kevin Sanders as George Lawrence, the general manager
Patricia Kerr as Margot Prescott, the president's daughter
Eric Gormley as Fred Newbury, a lawyer
Julian Flett
Georgie Sterling
Nigel Lovell
Eve Hardwicke
Carlotta Kalmar
Laurie Lange
John Llewellyn
Al Thomas.

See also
List of live television plays broadcast on Australian Broadcasting Corporation (1950s)

References

See also
Miss Mabel
Black Limelight

Lost television episodes
1959 television plays
Australian television plays
Australian live television shows
English-language television shows
Black-and-white Australian television shows